Homoranthus melanostictus is a flowering plant in the family Myrtaceae and is endemic to eastern Australia. It has cylinder-shaped to flattened leaves with blackish oil dots and up to six yellow flowers arranged in leaf axils near the ends of the branchlets.

Description

Taxonomy and naming
Homoranthus melanostictus was first formally described in 1991 by Lyndley Craven and S.R Jones and the description was published in Australian Systematic Botany. The specific epithet (melanostictus) is derived from the Ancient Greek words melas meaning "black" or "dark" and stiktos meaning "punctured", "dappled" or "spotted".

Distribution and habitat
Widely spread in south-eastern Queensland from north west of Taroom to south of Tara. Grows on sandy soils in shrubby woodland and heath.

Conservation status
A widespread and sometimes common species. Poorly reserved,  ROTAP conservation code 3RC using Briggs and Leigh (1996).

References

External links
 The Australasian Virtual Herbarium – Occurrence data for Homoranthus melanostictus

Flora of Queensland
Flora of New South Wales
Myrtales of Australia
melanostictus
Plants described in 1991